Johnny Dollar (March 8, 1933 – April 13, 1986) was an American country and rockabilly musician.

Biography
Dollar relocated to Dallas in the early 1950s, where he worked in trucking and in a lumber yard. In 1952 he recorded a single for D Records, but it was not successful, and Dollar then found work as a DJ in Louisiana and New Mexico. There he began fronting a group called the Texas Sons and performed on the Louisiana Hayride in the middle of the 1950s. Following this he played with the Light Crust Doughboys, but soon returned to Dallas, where he began performing in the nascent style of rockabilly. Working with promoter Ed McLemore and songwriter Jack Rhodes, he recorded a number of songs, but they were never issued, and Dollar soon left music, taking up work as an insurance salesman in Oklahoma.

In 1964, he met Ray Price, and this encounter led to a contract with Columbia Records. Through the second half of the 1960s, he had a number of hits for Dot Records, Date Records, and Chart Records; among them were "Big Big Rollin' Man" (U.S. Country No. 48, 1968) and "Big Wheels Sing for Me" (U.S. Country No. 65, 1969). His best-selling album was 1968's Johnny Dollar, which reached No. 41 on the U.S. Billboard Country Albums chart. His name was often confused with that of radio's fictional detective Johnny Dollar, "the man with the action-packed expense account"; Dollar the singer was often publicized as "Mr. Action-Packed."

For much of the 1970s, Dollar did production work, for the New Coon Creek Girls, Jimmy Dickens, and Teddy Nelson, among others.

Johnny Dollar married and divorced four times, and became an alcoholic; late in his career he acquired throat cancer, and the operations destroyed his ability to sing. He committed suicide on April 13, 1986. He is buried in the Nashville National Cemetery.

Albums

Singles

References

American country singer-songwriters
Singer-songwriters from Texas
1933 births
1986 deaths
People from Kilgore, Texas
Columbia Records artists
20th-century American singers
Country musicians from Texas
1986 suicides
Suicides in Tennessee